The B 242 is a federal highway in Germany. It runs from Seesen to Mansfeld.

Route 
The B 242, also known as the Harz High Road (Harzhochstraße), runs right across the Harz mountains in central Germany. From Seesen on the northwestern edge of the Harz near the A 7 motorway it runs through the Upper Harz past Clausthal-Zellerfeld, the High Harz, where it is combined for several kilometres with the B 4, past Braunlage and then through the eastern Harz foothills into Mansfelder Land. There it joins the  B 180 east of Klostermansfeld.

An extension of the B 242 via Polleben and Salzmünde to Halle (Saale) is being planned.

Rivers crossed 
 Innerste
 Oderteich
 Warme Bode, near Sorge
 Hassel between Hasselfelde and Stiege
 Selke near Alexisbad
 Wipper in Mansfeld

Photographs

See also 
 List of federal roads in Germany

242
Transport in the Harz